"Earth Is the Loneliest Planet" is a song by English singer Morrissey. It is the fifth track on his World Peace Is None of Your Business album and was released as the third single off the album via digital download on 3 June 2014, through Harvest and Capitol Records.

Due to changes in global music consumption, the physical versions of the first four singles from this album were released together as one 10" vinyl.

Music video
The accompanying music video, directed by Natalie Johns, was also released on 3 June 2014. As with the preceding videos from the album, it is presented in spoken word and features a cameo by Pamela Anderson.

Track listing
Digital download
 "Earth Is the Loneliest Planet" – 3:38

Personnel
 Morrissey – vocals

Additional musicians
 Boz Boorer – guitar 
 Jesse Tobias – guitar
 Solomon Walker – bass
 Matthew Walker – drums
 Gustavo Manzur – keyboards

Technical personnel
 Joe Chiccarelli – production

References

Songs about loneliness
2014 songs
2014 singles
Morrissey songs
Harvest Records singles
Capitol Records singles
Songs about cities
Songs written by Morrissey